"September All Over" is the third and final single by Swedish singer and songwriter September from her debut studio album September. It was released on 18 February 2004, one week after the release of the album. "September All Over" entered the Swedish singles chart on 27 February 2004 at the position of #15, peaked at #8 in its second week, and remained on the charts for 10 weeks. A new UK Radio Edit of the song was included on September's UK debut album, Cry for You – The Album, in 2009.

Track listing
CD single and digital download
 "September All Over" (Radio Version) – 3:47
 "September All Over" (Extended Version) – 6:10
 "September All Over" (The Jackal Vocal Clubmix (Short Edit)) – 3:53
 "September All Over" (The Jackal Vocal Clubmix (Long Edit)) – 6:56

Charts

References

Petra Marklund songs
2004 singles
2004 songs
Songs written by Jonas von der Burg
Songs written by Anoo Bhagavan
Songs written by Niklas von der Burg
Stockholm Records singles